"New Idols" is the first single to be released by Sheffield band The Long Blondes. It was released on Thee Sheffield Phonographic Corporation in June 2004 and was limited to 500 copies. The 7" vinyl is now highly collectible.

The front cover is a painting by Kate Jackson of Diana Dors in Yield to the Night.

Track listing
All lyrics written by Dorian Cox, Music by The Long Blondes

7"
 Side A "New Idols"
 Side B "Long Blonde"

References

External links
Review of 'New Idols' link

2004 singles
The Long Blondes songs
2004 songs
Songs written by Dorian Cox